The Clendinning Range is a subrange of the Pacific Ranges of the Coast Mountains of British Columbia.  About 1500 km2 (580 sq mi) in area and lies to the northwest of the better-known Tantalus Range near Squamish.  Heavily glaciated and very rugged, with severe weather year-round, it is between the valleys of the Elaho River (east) and the Toba River (west).

References

Clendinning Range in the Canadian Mountain Encyclopedia

Pacific Ranges
Sea-to-Sky Corridor